Massilia kyonggiensis is a Gram-negative and rod-shaped bacterium from the genus Massilia which has been isolated from the surface of a soil sample from a forest in Suwon in Korea.

References

Further reading

External links
Type strain of Massilia kyonggiensis at BacDive -  the Bacterial Diversity Metadatabase

Burkholderiales
Bacteria described in 2014